The Sri Bhasya is the most famous work of the Hindu philosopher Ramanuja (1017–1137). It is his commentary on Badarayana's Vedanta/Brahma Sutra.

Description 
In his commentary, Ramanuja presents the fundamental philosophical principles of Vishishtadvaita based on his interpretation of the Upanishads, Bhagavad Gita and other Smriti texts, the previous acharyas, and the Vedanta-sutra itself. This is done by way of refuting Shankara's Advaita Vedanta and in particular his theory of maya. In this work, he describes the three categories of reality (tattvas): God, soul, and matter, which have been used by the later Vaishnava theologians such as Madhva. He explains the relationship between the body and the soul. The principles of bhakti as a means to liberation (moksha) were also developed. Ramanuja wrote the Vedanta-Dipa and Vedanta-Sara to aid in the overall understanding of the Sri Bhasya.

References 
Hindu texts
11th-century books
Vedanta
Vishishtadvaita Vedanta

Sources 
Hajime Nakamura and Trevor Leggett, A History of Early Vedānta Philosophy, Vol 2, New Delhi, Motilal Banarsidass (1983)
Advaita Ashrama (2003). Brahma-Sutras According to Sri Ramanuja.

External links 
 Overview of Sribhashya by S.S. Raghavachar
 Translation of Sribhashya by George Thibaut
 Sruta Pradipika, Sanskrit commentary on Sribhashya by Sudarsana Suri with detailed English introduction